The 1968–69 Southern Football League season was the 66th in the history of the league, an English football competition.

Cambridge United won the championship, winning their first Southern League title, whilst Bath City, Brentwood Town, Crawley Town and Gloucester City were all promoted to the Premier Division. Twelve Southern League clubs applied to join the Football League at the end of the season, but none were successful.

Premier Division
The Premier Division consisted of 22 clubs, including 18 clubs from the previous season and four new clubs, promoted from Division One:
Bedford Town
Kettering Town
Rugby Town
Worcester City

At the end of the season Wellington Town were renamed Telford United.

League table

Division One
Division One consisted of 22 clubs, including 18 clubs from the previous season and four new clubs:
Three clubs relegated from the Premier Division:
Cambridge City
Corby Town
Hastings United

Plus:
Salisbury, joined from the Western Football League

Also, at the end of the previous season Folkestone Town was renamed Folkestone.

League table

Football League elections
Alongside the four League clubs facing re-election, a total of 10 non-League clubs applied for election, all of which were Southern League clubs. All four League clubs were re-elected.

See also
 Southern Football League
 1968–69 Northern Premier League

References
RSSF – Southern Football League archive

Southern Football League seasons
S